The Erkunt Group was established in 1953 in Turkey. The company was initially a casting and pattern shop. The tractor division of the Erkunt group is owned by the Indian giant Mahindra & Mahindra.

History
The company was established in 1953 in Turkey, as a general Foundry & pattern shop. By 1955, it had become a factory for machining parts as well as casting. The factory was chiefly engaged in the production of waste water pipes to NATO standards. Following 8 years of growth in 1961 the company became a corporation. Erkunt was then producing intermediate goods for the automotive, agricultural tractor and motor industries, utilizing the most advanced technology of the day.

Erkunt has grown to employment 174 white collar and 851 blue collar workers, totalling 1025 in a 60,000 ton/year capacity complex that is the leader in Turkey for grey iron and nodular casting production and mechanical processing.

For the past 20 years the company has increasingly been increasing exports to Europe. Production has grown to 60,000 tons per year. Erkunt exports %85 of total production of which 76% is machined, and 24% is raw castings. The companies products are produced to ISO/TS 16949 and the company registered to ISO 9001  and one of the largest independent casting and machining company in Europe.

Since 2017 the tractor division of Erkunt group is fully owned by Indian giant Mahindra & Mahindra.

Erkunt Tractor 

In 2003, the Erkunt Group started the tractor division with the establishment of Erkunt Tractor  Ind. Inc. and became a member of OEM group.

Tractor production started in September 2004. In the following 6 years, 8268 tractors were sold in domestic market through 73 dealers and 105 sales points. The company, which entered the market with only two models, is now able to offer potential customers in different countries almost 40 different models between 58 and 83 hp. At the end of year 2010, Erkunt's market share in Turkey is 18% and is the second biggest tractor manufacturer in Turkey.
Erkunt distributes tractors under ArmaTrac brand in international markets and works on distributorship basis.  Currently, Erkunt has distributors in Bulgaria, Hungary, Romania, Cyprus, Serbia, Greece, Austria, Finland, Portugal, Poland, Malta and Croatia in Europe as well as Morocco, Tanzania, Angola, Sudan, Yemen, Senegal and Mali in Africa; Barbuda and Antigua  in America and Iraq in Asia.  They have plans to grow and increase exports, including to the UK.

The tractors are designed by Turkish engineers, which is unusual in the Turkish tractor market, as most other manufacturers build them under license. The tractors are built to order. The tractors use ZF and Carraro transmissions built under license by them in Turkey.

Diesel Engines 
Perkins and Deutz manufacture the diesel engines.

See also
List of tractor manufacturers

References

External links
ArmaTrac webpage
Erkunt Tractor Industry, Inc. webpage

Tractor manufacturers of Turkey
Turkish brands
Mahindra Group